Gerhard Kempinski (1904–1947) was a German-born actor.

Partial filmography
 The Day Will Dawn (1942)
 We'll Smile Again (1942)
 Lady from Lisbon (1942)
 Thursday's Child (1943)
 Beware of Pity (1946)
 Spring Song (1946)
 Gaiety George (1946)
 Woman to Woman (1947)
 White Cradle Inn (1947)

References

External links

1904 births
1947 deaths
German male film actors
20th-century German male actors